Thomas Rauer (born 16 August 1977 in Essen) is a German former competitive ice dancer. He competed with his sister Stephanie Rauer. Together, they are two-time (2001, 2002) German national champions.

In autumn 2000, Thomas Rauer had a torn ligament in his foot.

He is an ISU Technical Specialist for Germany.

Programs 
(with Rauer)

Results 
(with Stephanie Rauer)

References

External links 
 

1977 births
Living people
German male ice dancers
International Skating Union technical specialists
Sportspeople from Essen